The 2022 NBL1 West season was the second season of the NBL1 West and 33rd overall in State Basketball League (SBL) / NBL1 West history. The regular season began on Friday 8 April and ended on Saturday 13 August. The finals began on Friday 19 August and concluded with the women's grand final on Friday 2 September and the men's grand final on Saturday 3 September.

Regular season
The regular season began on Friday 8 April and ended on Saturday 13 August after 19 rounds of competition. Easter games in round 2 were again scheduled for a blockbuster Thursday night, with all teams then on a break over the long weekend. Games then tipped-off again the following Friday for Anzac Round. There was also Women's Round (5), Mental Health Round (11) and Indigenous Round (14).

For the first time in club history, the Goldfields Giants fielded a women's team in 2022.

Standings

Men's ladder

Women's ladder

Finals
The finals began on Friday 19 August and consisted of four rounds. The finals concluded with the women's grand final on Friday 2 September and the men's grand final on Saturday 3 September.

Men's bracket

Women's bracket

Awards

Player of the Week

Coach of the Month

Statistics leaders
Stats as of the end of the regular season

Regular season
 Men's Most Valuable Player: Devondrick Walker (Rockingham Flames)
 Women's Most Valuable Player: Stacey Barr (Warwick Senators)
 Men's Coach of the Year: Dayle Joseph (Geraldton Buccaneers)
 Women's Coach of the Year: Marcus Wong (Joondalup Wolves)
 Men's Defensive Player of the Year: Cameron Coleman (Geraldton Buccaneers)
 Women's Defensive Player of the Year: Emma Gandini (Willetton Tigers)
 Men's Youth Player of the Year: Caleb Van De Griend (South West Slammers)
 Women's Youth Player of the Year: Nes'eya Parker-Williams (Joondalup Wolves)
 Sixth Man of the Year: Johny Narkle (Geraldton Buccaneers)
 Sixth Woman of the Year: Hannah Little (Mandurah Magic)
 Men's Leading Scorer: Devondrick Walker (Rockingham Flames)
 Women's Leading Scorer: Stacey Barr (Warwick Senators)
 Men's Leading Rebounder: Joshua Davey (Lakeside Lightning)
 Women's Leading Rebounder: Ruth Davis (Lakeside Lightning)
 Men's Golden Hands: Seva Chan (Cockburn Cougars)
 Women's Golden Hands: Robbi Ryan (Joondalup Wolves)
 All-NBL1 West Men's 1st Team:
 Marshall Nelson (Rockingham Flames)
 C. J. Turnage (Joondalup Wolves)
 Cameron Coleman (Geraldton Buccaneers)
 Devondrick Walker (Rockingham Flames)
 Caleb Davis (Warwick Senators)
 All-NBL1 West Women's 1st Team:
 Robbi Ryan (Joondalup Wolves)
 Stacey Barr (Warwick Senators)
 Emma Clarke (Perry Lakes Hawks)
 Teige Morrell (Joondalup Wolves)
 Jessie Edwards (Cockburn Cougars)

Finals
 Men's Grand Final MVP: Devondrick Walker (Rockingham Flames)
 Women's Grand Final MVP: Leonie Fiebich (Warwick Senators)

References

External links

 2022 fixtures
 Grand Final preview
 "2022 NBL1 West Grand Final match-up and preview" at australiabasket.com
 "Warwick Senators win NBL1 West grand final over Willetton Tigers as Leo Fiebich wins MVP in dominant display" at thewest.com.au
 "The NBL1 West's historic weekend" at nbl1.com.au
 Women's grand final highlights
 Men's grand final highlights
 NBL1 National Finals information
 NBL1 National Finals explainer
 NBL1 National Finals Women's Preview
 NBL1 National Finals Men's Preview
 National Finals –          

2022
2021–22 in Australian basketball
2022–23 in Australian basketball